Robert L. Shook (born April 7, 1938) is an American author who specializes in business books.

Early life
Robert L. Shook was born in Pittsburgh, Pennsylvania.  His father, Herbert M. Shook owned a small jewelry store in downtown Pittsburgh.  His mother, Belle was a full-time homemaker.  Shook and his three siblings attended public schools in Pittsburgh and following his high-school graduation in 1955 Shook enrolled at The Ohio State University.  He graduated with a BS in marketing in 1959.

Career

Business career
Upon his graduation Shook sold life insurance for six months and then served in the U.S. Army reserves as an enlisted man for six months.  In 1960–61, he was a sales rep for a men's clothing manufacturing company(s).  In September 1961, he and his father, Herbert M. Shook, started Shook Associates Corporation, an insurance agency that sold long-term disability policies and life insurance.  Shook was chairman of the board, and his father, Herbert was president.  In the beginning, their office was located in the basement of the family home.  In 1963, Shook moved to Columbus, Ohio with his wife Roberta (1941–1983) and six-month-old daughter, Faith Caroline where he opened an office for Shook Associates; within 10 years, Shook Associates Corporation had an estimated 200 full-time agents in Pa., Oh, Md, W.Va, Del, Va, Ind., Ky, NC, SC, Ga, Ala, Fla, Mass, Conn, Calif, Az. Tenn, and D.C.  In the mid-1970s, the father and son founded American Executive Life Insurance Company, a reinsurance company that was domiciled in Phoenix, Az.  Robert Shook served as chairman of the board of American Executive Life Insurance Company and Herbert was president.  In 1976, the two Shooks co-authored, How to be the Professional Salesman, a book used as a marketing tool to recruit salespeople for their agency.  Shook authored three other books while working full-time in the insurance field.  These books are: Total Commitment, Winning Images, and Ten Greatest Salespersons.  In 1978, Shook and his father sold Shook Associates Corporation and American Executive Company to a West Coast life insurance company.  Since then, Shook has been a full-time author and has 57 published books to his credit, five have appeared on The New York Times best sellers list.

Writing career
Shook's early books were mainly on selling and entrepreneurship, subjects he knew from personal experience.   He co-authored books with the number one salespersons in the financial planning, life insurance and automotive industries. These books are: Successful Telephone Selling in the 1980s, How To Make Big Money Selling, and How to Close Every Sale.   He has written several books profiling highly successful Americans.  These books include: The Entrepreneurs, The Real Estate People, The Chief Executive Officers, and Why Didn't I think of That, a book that featured chapters on such American iconic products as the Pet Rock, the Slinky, the Mood Ring, the Hula Hoop and the Frisbee.  He has also ghostwritten several books and authored books on large corporations.  He collaborated with Francis "Buck" Rodgers, the senior vice president of worldwide marketing at IBM to write The IBM Way.  During his career and inside his company, Rodgers was hailed as almost legendary and the quintessential IBM salesman.  A dynamic speaker, he has been the chief proselytizer of the IBM religion...preaching the beliefs to the legions of IBM employees and thousands of outsiders.  The book reveals that "the closer one gets to IBM, the more it becomes apparent that the majority of employees, whatever their personal ties, are, as professionals, unusually upright and uniformly dedicated to the notion that the customer pays their salaries.".  The IBM Way was an international best seller.  In Honda: An American Success Story, Shook quickly recounts Honda's history, and then probes at the reasons for its success.  Shook provides the key to understanding why Honda differs from competitors.   The key is not what it does but how it does it.  "The Honda Way comprises many different beliefs, none of which is unique," he writes.  "Rather it is the application of those beliefs that is uniquely Honda.".  Shook's book, Longaberger, the life story of David Longaberger was a number one best seller on The New York Times best seller list in 2001.  In The New Yorker described the basket enterprise: "Longaberger isn’t just a company.  It’s the heart of a thriving subculture, like Dungeons & Dragons or the Grateful Dead.  Longaberger fans buy, sell and trade Longaberger baskets as collectibles.".  Shook has interviewed many of the most successful people in the U.S.  His Miracle Medicines required him to interview scientists and researchers in the pharmaceutical industry.  He says, "The scientists are the most dedicated people I have ever met in my life.  They’re in their labs working 60, 70, 80 hours a week to benefit mankind.  A vast majority of them will never make a discovery that gets into the marketplace."

Books

 How to be The Complete Professional Salesman by Robert L. Shook (Frederick Fell Publishers, Inc., 1974) 
 Total Commitment by Robert L. Shook and Ronald Bingaman (Frederick Fell Publishers, Inc., 1975) 
 Winning Images (Macmillan Publishing Co., Inc., 1975) 
 Ten Greatest Salespersons (Harper & Row Publishers, Inc., 1978) 
 Successful Telephone Selling in the 1980s by Martin Shafiroff and Robert L. Shook (Harper & Row Publishers, Inc., 1982) 
 How To Make Big Money Selling, by Joe Gandolfo and Robert L. Shook (Harper & Row Publishers, Inc., 1984) 
 How to Close Every Sale, by Joe Girard with Robert L. Shook (Warner Books, paperback 1989) 
 The Entrepreneurs by Robert L. Shook (Harper & Row Publishers, Inc., 1980) 
 The Real Estate People by Robert L. Shook (Harper & Row Publishers, Inc., 1980) 
 The Chief Executive Officers by Robert L. Shook (Harper & Row Publishers, Inc., 1981) 
 Why Didn't I think of That by Robert L. Shook (The New American Library, Inc., 1982) 
 The IBM Way by Francis G. "Buck" Rodgers with Robert L. Shook (Harper & Row Publishers, Inc., 1986) 
 Honda: An American Success Story by Robert L. Shook (Prentice Hall Press, 1988) 
 Longaberger: An American Success Story by Dave Longaberger with Robert L. Shook (HarperCollins Publishers, Inc., 2001) 
The Shaklee Story 1982

References

1938 births
Living people